was an admiral in the Imperial Japanese Navy during World War II.

Biography 
Takahashi was a native of Fukushima prefecture, born in a family of Eastern Orthodox faithful. His name "Ibō" was Chinese transliteration of "John". His father was  a samurai of the Aizu domain, and doctor. He graduated from the 36th class of the Imperial Japanese Naval Academy in 1908 and was ranked 10th out of 191 cadets. He subsequently served on the destroyer  and battleship .

Around this time, Takahashi became involved in the militant movement within the Japanese military, and helped influence the implementation of the proposal to devolve overall naval command from the Minister of the Navy to the Chief of Naval General Staff (the implementation of which was ratified by Emperor Hirohito on September 25, 1933).

From August 1923 to August 1925, Takahashi was assigned as naval attaché to the United Kingdom, during which time he was promoted to commander. He was also part of the Japanese delegation to the London Naval Treaty negotiations in late 1929.

He was promoted to rear admiral on November 15, 1935, and became chief of the Second Section of the Imperial Japanese Navy General Staff. While on the General Staff, he was a strong proponent of the Nanshin-ron, urging that New Guinea, Borneo and the Celebes in the Netherlands East Indies be considered as part of Japan's strategic sphere-of-interest. On November 15, 1939, Takahashi became vice admiral, and was given command of the Mako Guard District.

Shortly before the attack on Pearl Harbor, Takahashi served as commander-in-chief of the IJN 3rd Fleet, which included the 5th and 7th Cruiser Squadrons and the 2nd and 4th Destroyer Flotillas and formed part of the Southern Force under the command of Vice Admiral Nobutake Kondō based in Taiwan in 1941.

In January and February 1942, this force was split into the Eastern and Central Forces; the first for the invasions of Menado, Kendari and Makassar in Celebes and amphibious operations in the Banda Sea, and the second for the invasion of Dutch Borneo. Takahashi was Commander of Eastern and Central Forces during the invasions of Bali and Java. His forces included the "Direct Support Force" under Rear Admiral Shōji Nishimura, commander of the 4th Destroyer Squadron, the "Second Escort Force" under Rear Admiral Raizo Tanaka, commander of the 2nd Destroyer Squadron, the 1st and 2nd "Naval Base Forces", under Rear Admiral Takeo Kurita, the "Third Escort Force", under Rear-Admiral Chuichi Hara, and the "First Air Group" made up of the light carrier  and 56 transports.

On March 10, 1942, he was transferred to the newly created 2nd Southern Expeditionary Fleet, and to the newly created Southwest Area Fleet a month later. In November 1942, he was transferred back to Japan to become Commander in Chief of the Kure Naval District. He held this post until retiring from active duty in 1944.

On 2 December 1945, in Tokyo, he was accused of war crimes and arrested by the American occupation forces.

Personal life 
Takahashi had two sons named Taro and Yoshiro, both of whom followed their father into the Imperial Japanese Navy. Taro graduated from the Imperial Japanese Naval Academy as part of the 69th Class on 25 March 1941, and was killed in action at the Battle of Leyte Gulf on 26 October 1944 while serving as Gunnery Officer of the destroyer Nowaki. Yoshiro graduated as part of the 71st Class on 14 November 1942, and survived the war.

Notes

References

Web

Books 

1888 births
1947 deaths
Military personnel from Fukushima Prefecture
Imperial Japanese Navy admirals
Japanese admirals of World War II
Eastern Orthodox Christians from Japan